Hannah Clarke (formerly Baxter; 8 September 1988 – 19 February 2020) was an Australian woman who was fatally burned in a petrol fire in her car, along with her three children, in a quadruple murder–suicide by her estranged husband, Rowan Baxter, in Camp Hill, Queensland. The murders sparked a national debate about domestic violence in Australia, after reports emerged that Baxter had a history of violence and alleged misogyny and had been subjected to a domestic violence order (DVO) as well as child custody orders as recently as the month of the murders.

Background
Hannah Clarke met New Zealand-born Rowan Baxter, eleven years her senior, when she was aged 19. Baxter, a former rugby league player who played for the New Zealand Warriors, was previously married to another woman. He proposed to Clarke in 2011 and they married in Kingscliff, New South Wales, in 2012. They had three children: Aaliyah, 6; Laianah, 4; and Trey, 3. Reports emerged after the murders that Clarke had allegedly been emotionally, physically, sexually and financially abused by Baxter during their marriage.

Baxter was subjected to a DVO after he allegedly kidnapped Laianah on Boxing Day 2019. He had rejected his lawyer's advice in mediation and refused to sign a consent order offered by Clarke allowing him 165 days of custody a year. The DVO was varied in the Holland Park Magistrates' Court in January 2020, returning Baxter's full access to his children. The couple then went to mediation, with Baxter refusing to sign the consent order which would lock in custody of the children. He subsequently signed a parenting agreement that gave him the same level of access but was not legally binding. This access was revoked in early February when police charged him with breaching the DVO. Although unclear when she began to do so, Clarke legally used her maiden name rather than her married name.

Attack 
On 19 February 2020, Baxter set fire to the interior of the car Clarke was driving to drop their children at school, quickly killing their children. Clarke was able to make it out of the car and allegedly told witnesses that Baxter had poured petrol on her. While the car was burning, Baxter stopped bystanders from putting out the fire before he stabbed himself to death. Clarke was rushed to the Royal Brisbane Hospital with burns to 97% of her body, but died there that evening.

Funeral
Clarke and her children were buried on 9 March 2020. Australian Prime Minister Scott Morrison and Queensland Premier Annastacia Palaszczuk attended their joint funeral.

Legacy 
In March, Clarke's family established the foundation 'Small Steps 4 Hannah' in honour of the slain children. The charity states its establishment is to "put a HALT to the incidences and severity of domestic and family violence in Australia".

On 23 February, over 1,000 people gathered to celebrate and mourn the family in a public vigil held at the Bill Hewitt Reserve in Camp Hill. A small section of the same reserve was later memorialised as 'Hannah's Place' with a sign, shelter and newly planted trees. On 8 September 2020, 'Hannah's Place' was opened by Coorparoo Councillor, Cr Fiona Cunningham along with Clarke's family, on what would have been Hannah's 32nd birthday.

Clarke was named one of Marie Claire magazine's 'Women of the Year' in their December 2020 issue, for the nationwide awareness brought to the issue of coercive control in Australia.

See also
Abusive power and control
Domestic violence in Australia
Familicide
Psychological abuse

References

1988 births
2020 deaths
2020 murders in Australia
February 2020 events in Australia
Deaths by person in Australia
Deaths from fire
Female murder victims
People from Queensland
People murdered in Queensland
Murder–suicides in Australia
People from Brisbane
Murder in Brisbane
Familicides
Violence against women in Australia
Mass murder in Australia
Mass murder in 2020
2020s in Queensland